Deena Jal Guzder (born November 1984) is a human rights journalist and author. Her work has appeared in Time, National Geographic Traveler, The Washington Post, United Press International, Reuters, Indian Express, Ms. Magazine, Global Post, Mother Jones, HuffPost, and Common Dreams. She was awarded journalism grants from the Knight Foundation to report on theocracy and democracy in Iran; the Scripps Howard Foundation to report on low-caste Dalit in India; and the Pulitzer Center on Crisis Reporting to report on forced prostitution and human trafficking in Thailand as well as a report for Red Cross Red Crescent magazine on the value of volunteers during the 2010 Pakistan floods.

Guzder works at Democracy Now! in New York City.

Biography

Early life and education
Guzder graduated from Oberlin College in 2006 with a triple major in Peace & Conflict Resolution, Politics, and English (concentrating on Creative Writing). Guzder earned a dual-degree from Columbia University Graduate School of Journalism and School of International and Public Affairs in May 2008. She is the youngest person to graduate from Columbia University Graduate School of Journalism.

Political and religious beliefs
As an antiwar activist, Guzder grew interested in the way politicians warp religion to justify warfare.

Although not a Christian, she said she came to greatly appreciate the Historic Peace Churches and Catholic Worker Movement.

Raised as a Zoroastrian, Guzder's beliefs center on "good words, good thoughts, good deeds".

She has stated: "I don’t describe as anything. I think labels constrict people’s understanding of concepts or ideas."

Works
Guzder wrote a book about the spiritual left, Divine Rebels: American Christian Activists for Social Justice (2011).

Guzder also helped Shyalpa Rinpoche, a Tibetan Buddhist lama, to compile his oral teachings into Living Fully.

She also assisted Pulitzer Prize-winning journalist Chris Hedges research his 2010 book Death of the Liberal Class.

References

Publications

Interviews
 
 

1984 births
21st-century American women
American people of Parsi descent
American women non-fiction writers
American Zoroastrians
Journalists from New York City
Living people